The 1961 Ole Miss Rebels football team represented the University of Mississippi as a member of the Southeastern Conference (SEC) during the 1961 NCAA University Division football season. Led by 15th-year head coach Johnny Vaught, the Rebels compiled an overall record of 9–2 with a mark of 5–1 in conference play, placing third in the SEC. Ole Miss received a berth in the Cotton Bowl, where the Rebels  lost to Texas, 12–7.

Schedule
Ole Miss was favored in every game throughout the 1961 season as two–time defending champions. The Rebels played against SEC opponents LSU, Tennessee, Kentucky, Mississippi State and Tulane and finished the season with a 9–2 record and a 5–1 record in SEC play.

References

Ole Miss
Ole Miss Rebels football seasons
Ole Miss Rebels football